Wi-Fi positioning system (WPS, also abbreviated as WiPS or WFPS) is a geolocation system that uses the characteristics of nearby Wi-Fi hotspots and other wireless access points to discover where a device is located. 

It is used where satellite navigation such as GPS is inadequate due to various causes including multipath and signal blockage indoors, or where acquiring a satellite fix would take too long.  Such systems include assisted GPS, urban positioning services through hotspot databases, and indoor positioning systems. Wi-Fi positioning takes advantage of the rapid growth in the early 21st century of wireless access points in urban areas.

The most common and widespread localization technique used for positioning with wireless access points is based on measuring the intensity of the received signal (received signal strength indication or RSSI) and the method of "fingerprinting". Typical parameters useful to geolocate the wireless access point include its SSID and MAC address. The accuracy depends on the number of nearby access points whose positions have been entered into the database. The Wi-Fi hotspot database gets filled by correlating mobile device GPS location data with Wi-Fi hotspot MAC addresses. The possible signal fluctuations that may occur can increase errors and inaccuracies in the path of the user. To minimize fluctuations in the received signal, there are certain techniques that can be applied to filter the noise.

In the case of low precision, some techniques have been proposed to merge the Wi-Fi traces with other data sources such as geographical information and time constraints (i.e., time geography).

Motivation and applications 
Accurate indoor localization is becoming more important for Wi-Fi based devices due to the increased use of augmented reality, social networking, health care monitoring, personal tracking, inventory control and other indoor location-aware applications.

In wireless security, it is an important task used to locate and map rogue access points

The popularity and low price of Wi-Fi network interface cards is an attractive incentive to use Wi-Fi as the basis for a localization system and significant research has been done in this area in the past 15 years.

Problem statement and basic concepts 
The problem of Wi-Fi based indoor localization of a device consists in determining the position of client devices with respect to access points. Many techniques exist to accomplish this, and these may be classified into four main types:  received signal strength indication (RSSI), fingerprinting, angle of arrival (AoA) and time of flight (ToF) based techniques.

In most cases the first step to determine a device's position is to determine the distance between the target client device and a few access points. With the known distances between the target device and access points, trilateration algorithms may be used to determine the relative position of the target device, using the known position of access points as a reference. Alternatively, the angle of arriving signals at a target client device can be employed to determine the device's location based on triangulation algorithms.

A combination of these techniques may be used to increase the accuracy of the system.

Techniques

Signal strength based 
RSSI localization techniques are based on measuring signal strength from a client device to several different access points, and then combining this information with a propagation model to determine the distance between the client device and the access points. Trilateration (sometimes called multilateration) techniques can be used to calculate the estimated client device position relative to the known position of access points.

Though one of the cheapest and easiest methods to implement, its disadvantage is that it does not provide very good accuracy (median of 2-4m), because the RSSI measurements tend to fluctuate according to changes in the environment or multipath fading.

Cisco systems is using RSSI to locate devices through its Access Points. Access points collect the location data and update the location on the Cisco cloud called Cisco DNA Spaces.

Fingerprinting based 
Traditional fingerprinting is also RSSI-based, but it simply relies on the recording of the signal strength from several access points in range and storing this information in a database along with the known coordinates of the client device in an offline phase. This information can be deterministic or probabilistic. During the online tracking phase, the current RSSI vector at an unknown location is compared to those stored in the fingerprint and the closest match is returned as the estimated user location. Such systems may provide a median accuracy of 0.6m and tail accuracy of 1.3m.

Its main disadvantage is that any changes to the environment, such as adding or removing furniture or buildings, may change the "fingerprint" that corresponds to each location, requiring an update to the fingerprint database. However, integration with other sensors such as cameras can be used in order to deal with a changing environment.

Angle of arrival based 

With the advent of MIMO Wi-Fi interfaces, which use multiple antennas, it is possible to estimate the AoA of the multipath signals received at the antenna arrays in the access points, and apply triangulation to calculate the location of client devices. SpotFi, ArrayTrack and LTEye are proposed solutions which employ this kind of technique.

Typical computation of the AoA is done with the MUSIC algorithm.

Considering that the -th propagation path arrives with angle  with respect to the normal of the antenna array of the access point,  is the attenuation experienced at any antenna of the array. The attenuation is the same in every antenna, except for a phase shift which changes for every antenna due to the extra distance traveled by the signal. This means that the signal arrives with an additional phase of

at the second antenna and

at the -th antenna.

Therefore, the following complex exponential can be used as a simplified representation of the phase shifts experienced by each antenna as a function of the AoA of the propagation path:

The AoA can then be expressed as the vector  of received signals due to the -th propagation path, where  is the steering vector and given by:There is one steering vector for each propagation path, and the steering matrix  (of dimensions ) is then defined as:and the received signal vector  is:where  is the vector complex attenuations along the  paths. OFDM transmits data over multiple different sub carriers, so the measured received signals  corresponding to each sub carrier form the matrix  expressed as:The matrix   is given by the channel state information (CSI) matrix which can be extracted from modern wireless cards with special tools such as the Linux 802.11n CSI Tool.

The AoAs can then be deduced from this matrix and used to estimate the position of the client device through triangulation.

Though this technique is usually more accurate than others, it may require special hardware in order to be deployed, such as an array of six to eight antennas or rotating antennas. SpotFi proposes the use of a superresolution algorithm which takes advantage of the number of measurements taken by each of the antennas of the Wi-Fi cards with only three antennas, and also incorporates ToF based localization to improve its accuracy.

Time of flight based 

Time of flight (ToF) localization approach takes timestamps provided by the wireless interfaces to calculate the ToF of signals and then use this information to estimate the distance and relative position of one client device with respect to access points. The granularity of such time measurements is in the order of nanoseconds and systems which use this technique have reported localization errors in the order of 2m. Typical applications for this technology are tagging and locating assets in buildings, for which room-level accuracy (~3m) is usually enough.

The time measurements taken at the wireless interfaces are based on the fact that RF waves travel close to the speed of light, which remains nearly constant in most propagation media in indoor environments. Therefore, the signal propagation speed (and consequently the ToF) is not affected so much by the environment as the RSSI measurements are.

Unlike traditional ToF-based echo techniques, such as those used in RADAR systems, Wi-Fi echo techniques use regular data and acknowledgement communication frames to measure the ToF.

As in the RSSI approach, the ToF is used only to estimate the distance between the client device and access points. Then a trilateration technique can be used to calculate the estimated position of the device relative to the access points. The greatest challenges in the ToF approach consist in dealing with clock synchronization issues, noise, sampling artifacts and multipath channel effects. Some techniques use mathematical approaches to remove the need for clock synchronization.

More recently, the Wi-Fi Round Trip Time standard has provided fine ToF ranging capabilities to WiFi.

Privacy concerns 
Citing the specific privacy concerns arising out of WPS, Google suggested a unified approach for opting-out a particular access point from taking part in determining location using WPS. Appending "_nomap" to a wireless access point's SSID excludes it from Google's WPS database. Google hopes that other WPS providers and data collectors, like Apple and Microsoft, follow that recommendation so that it becomes an accepted standard. Mozilla honors _nomap as a method of opting-out of its location service.

Public Wi-Fi location databases 

A number of public Wi-Fi location databases are available (only active projects):

See also 
 Automatic vehicle location
 Hybrid positioning system
 Indoor positioning system
 MAC address
 Mobile phone tracking

References 

General

 Anthony LaMarca, Yatin Chawathe, Sunny Consolvo, Jeffrey Hightower, Ian Smith, James Scott, Tim Sohn, James Howard, Jeff Hughes, Fred Potter, Jason Tabert, Pauline Powledge, Gaetano Borriello, Bill Schilit: Place Lab: Device Positioning Using Radio Beacons in the Wild. In Pervasive (2005)

Wireless networking
Radio geopositioning
Internet geolocation
Wi-Fi